

Events
Following his release from prison, Salvatore "Sam," "Mooney" Giancana becomes a high-ranking member of the Chicago Outfit and a personal advisor and primary enforcer for Antonino "Tony," "Joe Batters" Accardo.
Eugenio "Gene" Giannini, a soldier for the Lucchese crime family, is apprehended by federal agents on heroin conspiracy charges. While serving fifteen months imprisonment, Giannini agrees to become a government informant for the Bureau of Narcotics and later the FBI.
February 19 – Murder, Inc. members Harry Maione and Frank Abbandando are executed by the state of New York following their murder trial the previous year.
May 12 – New York mobster Charles Luciano is transferred from Clinton State Prison in Dannemora, New York, to Great Meadow State Prison in Fort Ann, New York. Luciano meets with US military intelligence in prison to negotiate his early parole.  Intelligence wants him to contact Sicilian mafiosi to aid the Sicily Invasion and to prevent sabotage on the waterfronts of the East Coast of the United States by Nazi sympathizers.
August 3 - Morris "Moey" Wolenski, a lieutenant of Louis "Lepke" Buchalter, is murdered. Many suspect that Wolenski (or Wolinsky) mislead Buchalter about a deal to reduce Buchalter's prison sentence during his 1939 trial.
December 5 – Vincenzo Capizzi, former leader of the Pittsburgh, Pennsylvania crime syndicate (reportedly succeeded by John Sebastian LaRocca in 1937), is arrested by FBI agents for conspiracy to violate the National Bankruptcy Act.

Births
January 25 – Kenichi Shinoda, the founding head of the Kodo-kai and the sixth head of the Yamaguchi-gumi, the largest known yakuza syndicate in Japan
August 6 – George Jung, Medellín Cartel drug trafficker
September 7 – Roy DeMeo, Gambino crime family hitman and Capo
September 16 – Tadamasa Goto, the founding head of the Goto-gumi, a secondary Yamaguchi-gumi affiliate
Francesco Bonura, Sicilian mafia member
Stephen Caracappa, NYPD officer and mob hitman
Richard V. Gotti, member of the Gambino crime family
Gennaro Langella (Jerry Lang), member of the Colombo crime family

Deaths
February 19 – Harry Maione "Happy", Murder, Inc. hitman
February 19 – Frank Abbandando "The Dasher", Murder, Inc. hitman
July 20 - Moses Annenberg "Moe", newspaper publisher and Al Capone associate
August 3 - Moey Wolinsky, a lieutenant of Louis Buchalter

Organized crime
Years in organized crime